Trevor LeGassick (August 19, 1934June 21, 2022) was a noted Western scholar and translator in the field of Arabic literature. He obtained a BA in Arabic from the School of Oriental and African Studies in 1958 and completed a PhD, also from SOAS, in 1960. After stints in Wisconsin and Indiana, he joined the faculty of the University of Michigan in 1966, where he would teach for fifty-two years. He was promoted to full professor in 1979.

LeGassick published three books and numerous articles on contemporary Arabic culture and literature. He was also noted as a translator of Arabic novels, short stories and plays, covering a wide range of modern writers such as Naguib Mahfouz, Halim Barakat, Yusuf Idris and Emile Habiby. His 1975 translation of Mahfouz's novel Midaq Alley was one of the first works to introduce English speakers to the writings of the eventual Nobel Prize winner.

He retired as Emeritus Professor at the University of Michigan on May 31, 2022 and passed away on June 21, 2022.

Books
 Major Themes in Modern Arabic Thoughts (1979)
 The Defense Statement of Ahmad 'Urabi(1982)
 Critical Perspectives on Naguib Mahfouz (1990)

Selected translations
 Midaq Alley by Naguib Mahfouz. 1975
 Days of Dust by Halim Barakat. 1974
 Flipflop and His Master by Yusuf Idris. A three-act play in translation, 1977
 I Am Free and Other Stories by Ihsan Abd El Koddous. 1978.
 The Secret Life of Saeed (A Palestinian Who Became a Citizen of Israel) by Emile Habiby. Co-translator: Salma Khadra Jayyusi. 1982
 The Thief and the Dogs by Naguib Mahfouz. Co-translator: M. Badawi. 1984
 Wild Thorns by Sahar Khalifeh. Co-translator: Elizabeth Fernea. 1985

References

1935 births
Living people
Arabic–English translators
University of Michigan faculty